Rubus trilobus, the boulder raspberry or delicious raspberry, is Mesoamerican species of flowering plant in the rose family. It is native to Guatemala and to southern and central Mexico (Chiapas, Oaxaca, Veracruz, Puebla, Tlaxcala).

Description
Rubus trilobus grows in moist or wet coniferous forests in the mountains. It is a shrub sometimes as much as 5 meters (200 inches or 16.7 feet) tall. It does not have prickles. Leaves are broadly three-lobed with teeth along the edges, green on the upper side, lighter green on the underside. Flowers are white. Fruit is dark purple.

References

External links
photo of herbarium specimen at University of Texas, collected in Oaxaca in 1995

trilobus
Flora of Guatemala
Flora of Mexico
Plants described in 1825